Arthur F. Smith was an American football coach. He served as the head football coach the University of Tulsa in 1918, Baker University in Baldwin City, Kansas, in 1919, and Kenyon College in Gambier, Ohio from 1920 to 1921, compiling a career college football coaching record of record of 8–12–7.

Smith attended Missouri Wesleyan College in Cameron, Missouri, where he played football and baseball before graduating in 1914. He began his coaching career in 1914 at Leavenworth High School in Leavenworth, Kansas and moved to Tucson High School in Tucson, Arizona two years later. He joined the coaching staff at 
the University of Illinois in 1922.

Head coaching record

References

Year of birth missing
Year of death missing
Baker Wildcats football coaches
Missouri Wesleyan Owls football players
Kenyon Lords football coaches
Tulsa Golden Hurricane football coaches
High school football coaches in Arizona
High school football coaches in Kansas